House Arrest is a 1996 American comedy film directed by Harry Winer, written by Michael Hitchcock, and starring Jamie Lee Curtis,  Kevin Pollak, Jennifer Tilly, Christopher McDonald, Wallace Shawn, and Ray Walston with supporting roles done by Kyle Howard, Amy Sakasitz, Mooky Arizona, Russel Harper, and an up-and-coming Jennifer Love Hewitt. It tells the story of two children who trap their parents in their basement upon their plans for a separation as the other children they know get involved by trapping their respective problem parents as well.

The film was released on August 14, 1996 and went on to gross just over $7 million at the box office. The film was panned by critics.

The film was shot at various locations in the U.S. states of California and Ohio. Monrovia, California was the location for several exterior house scenes while most interior shots were done at the CBS/Radford lot in Studio City, California. The story was set in Defiance, Ohio, although another town, Chagrin Falls, Ohio, actually doubled for it.

Plot
In Defiance, Ohio, the Beindorf family, consisting of Ned, Janet, Grover, and Stacy, live a supposedly happy typical family life in the suburbs of Defiance, Ohio. In fact, Ned and Janet are not happy and are separating, although they tell Grover and Stacy it is not a divorce.

Grover and Stacy first try to recreate their parents' honeymoon in the basement, but this fails to bring any happiness into their relationship. Grover and Stacy then leave the basement, telling Ned and Janet they must get another surprise for them upstairs. They go up, close the door, and nail it shut. They vow to keep it so until Ned and Janet work out their problems and get their marriage back on its feet.

The next day, Grover tells his best friend Matt Finley what he has done and T.J. Krupp, the wealthy local bully, overhears them. Matt goes over to the Beindorfs' house to look at Grover and Stacy's work and is impressed. T.J. shows up to have a look and actually installs a newer, more secure door to keep Ned and Janet trapped.

He and Matt then leave to collect their parents and bring them there to lock them up as well. Matt's father Vic, never keeps a wife for more than two years and is on his latest wife Louise. T.J.'s father Donald does not treat his wife Gwenna well. 

Matt also brings his bulldog Cosmo and two younger brothers Jimmy and Teddy who come armed with sleeping bags and T.J. brings his boa constrictor Spot. When Grover asks what is going on in response to his friends setting up camp at his house, T.J. replies with "Our parents could be down there for months!"

Ned and Janet almost talk Grover into letting them out, but Donald threatens him with legal action. Grover finds out that his dream girl Brooke Figler is also having parental problems: her mother Cindy acts like a teenager, going so far as to trying to hang out with Brooke's friends. Grover invites her to lock Cindy up with the rest. 

The children begin to help their parents solve their problems. They try to find a way out of the basement while getting along and seeing what each of their problems are. The children also work out their differences with each other above. They eventually give in and up to the police led by Chief Rocco. Their parents are set free.

Some time later, Ned and Janet reconcile and took a second honeymoon to Hawaii. Vic and Louise's marriage lasted past the two-year mark and they are expecting another child. Donald and Gwenna get divorced, though she later goes back to law school and they open up a law firm together. Cindy starts dating other men instead of intruding on Brooke's dates. Also, Grover and Brooke became sweethearts and she passionately kisses him in front of their classmates at school. He concludes that if his parents ever try to get divorced again, he might think of locking them in the attic.

Cast

Reception

Critical response
The film received negative reviews from critics. On Rotten Tomatoes it has an approval rating of 10% based on 30 reviews. The site's consensus states: "Constructed out of cliches, thinly written characters, and fundamental misunderstandings of human nature, House Arrest is a dull (and borderline irresponsible) waste of a talented cast." Audiences surveyed by CinemaScore gave the film a grade "B+" on scale of A to F.

Gene Siskel of the Chicago Tribune gave the film 0 out of 4 and called the film: "One of the year's worst movies... at least I hope so, or it's going to be a very bad year."
Joe Leydon of Variety magazine called it "A tepid and repetitious comedy."

Awards
 Young Artist Awards
 Best Performance in a Feature Film – Leading Young Actor – Kyle Howard (nominated)
 Best Song – Too Good To Wake From – Zendetta (nominated)
 Best Score – Midville USA – Bruce Broughton (nominated)

References

External links

 
 
 
 

1996 films
1990s teen films
American comedy films
1990s English-language films
1996 comedy films
Metro-Goldwyn-Mayer films
Films set in Ohio
Films directed by Harry Winer
Rysher Entertainment films
Films scored by Bruce Broughton
1990s American films